Costcutter Supermarkets Group is a business based in the United Kingdom and Ireland primarily operating as a symbol group supplier to various independently owned convenience shops and off-licences. It has operations in the United Kingdom, the Republic of Ireland and Poland. It encompasses both supermarkets and convenience shops. As of December 2006, Costcutter (Ireland) was owned by James A. Barry and Co.

The group owns the Costcutter, Mace, Supershop, and Simply Fresh brands.

History
Costcutter was founded in 1986, by Colin Graves. As of November 2006, there were some 1,400 shops under the banner. In May 2006, the majority of shops were in the United Kingdom, with 120 shops in the Republic of Ireland and 52 in Poland.

A proposed merger with Nisa-Today's collapsed in November 2006, after concerns about a cartel. which were reported to the Office of Fair Trading by members of Nisa-Today's, who opposed the merger. These claims were eventually proved to be unfounded and no action was taken by the OFT.

Costcutter revived the Kwik Save brand in 2012, from a separate chain which had ceased trading.

In 2018, The Co-Op Group made an offer of £15M in an attempt to take ownership of Costcutter. The bid was rejected, but it was believed that the door was left open for further talks. The Co-op subsequently became the sole supplier to the Costcutter group.

In 2020, Costcutter built 20 pop-up stores in NHS hospitals, designed to help serve doctors and nurses who may have been unable to travel due to the Coronavirus.

In December 2020, Costcutter was acquired by the wholesaler Bestway. The Co-op supply agreement continues.

References

External links
Costcutter website (UK)

Supermarkets of the United Kingdom
Convenience stores of the United Kingdom
Purchasing consortia
Companies based in York
Retail companies established in 1986
1986 establishments in the United Kingdom
Supermarkets of Ireland
Supermarkets of Poland
Retail companies of the United Kingdom